James Timothy Burke (October 12, 1874 – March 26, 1942) was a Major League Baseball third baseman, coach, and manager. He played for the Cleveland Spiders, St. Louis Perfectos, Milwaukee Brewers, Chicago White Stockings, Pittsburgh Pirates, and St. Louis Cardinals.

Burke was the regular third baseman for the Cardinals from 1903 to 1905. He was named player-manager in the middle of the 1905, season but was replaced by Stanley Robison after amassing  a record of 34–56.

Playing career
Burke made his debut in October of 1898 for the Cleveland Spiders. He was one of many players moved from Cleveland to St. Louis the following season, a move that stocked Cleveland with inferior and inept ball players that resulted in that team producing the worst record ever in Major league baseball. Burke only played a couple of games for St. Louis, now called the St. Louis Perfectos. 

In 1901, he split time between the Milwaukee Brewers and Chicago White Sox of the American League. After being released by Chicago in 1901, he signed with the National League's Pittsburgh Pirates where once again he played only occasionally. 

Burke never got anywhere near close to regular playing time until he was traded by Pittsburgh to the St. Louis Cardinals. In 1903, his first season with significant playing time, he batted .285 and rove in 42 runs. However, despite in appearing in over hundred games in both of the next seasons, Burke found himself playing for the Kansas City Blues in the minor leagues. Burke never again played in the majors, finishing his career with the Fort Wayne Champs of the Central League in 1913.

Coaching
From 1914 through 1917, Burke was a coach for the Detroit Tigers. He then served as manager for the St. Louis Browns from 1918 through 1920.  In 1921, he became a coach for the Boston Red Sox, a position he held for three seasons.  Burke later was a coach for the Chicago Cubs from 1926 through 1930, and was last a coach with the New York Yankees from 1931 through 1933.

Managerial record

See also
List of Major League Baseball player–managers

References

External links
 , or Retrosheet
 Managerial record
 

 

1874 births
1942 deaths
Major League Baseball third basemen
Cleveland Spiders players
St. Louis Perfectos players
Milwaukee Brewers (1901) players
Chicago White Sox players
Pittsburgh Pirates players
St. Louis Cardinals players
St. Louis Cardinals managers
St. Louis Browns managers
New York Yankees coaches
Chicago Cubs coaches
Detroit Tigers coaches
Boston Red Sox coaches
Toledo Mud Hens managers
Peoria Distillers players
Lansing Senators players
Peoria Blackbirds players
Milwaukee Brewers (minor league) players
Milwaukee Creams players
Minneapolis Millers (baseball) players
Rochester Bronchos players
Kansas City Blues (baseball) players
Louisville Colonels (minor league) players
Indianapolis Indians players
Fort Wayne Billikens players
Fort Wayne Champs players
Indianapolis Indians managers
Major League Baseball player-managers
19th-century baseball players
Kansas City Blues (baseball) managers
Louisville Colonels (minor league) managers
Burials at Calvary Cemetery (St. Louis)